Mark Tuggle is an American politician who served in the Alabama House of Representatives from the 81st district from 2010 to 2018.

References

Living people
Republican Party members of the Alabama House of Representatives
Year of birth missing (living people)